Afia Schwarzenegger, also known as Valentina Nana Agyeiwaa (born 14 February 1982, Kumasi, Ghana) is a Ghanaian media personality. She was the host Okay FM's morning show Yewo krom and UTV Ghana's Kokooko show, being fired from those outlets for alleged gross misconduct. She is the C.E.O. of Schwar TV on YouTube; The Ceo of QAS purified water, the host of The breakfast show and was appointed as the ambassador of Orphans in Ghana by the Association of Children Homes and Orphanages in Ghana. She is also the founder of Leave2Live foundation, a domestic violence support group and the founder of Owontaa Street Ministry,a non profitable organisation that feeds the less privilege in Ghana Afia has also worked for TV Africa and Kasapa FM. She came in to the limelight through the Afia Schwarzenegger TV series produced by Deloris Frimpong Manso.

Controversy

The Tema High Court has fined socialite, Valentina Nana Agyeiwaa, an amount of GH¢60,000 (5,000 penalty units) in a contempt case pending before it.

The Court also fined the entertainment personality GH¢5000 to be paid to Bernard Antwi Boasiako aka Chairman Wontumi, for making defamatory comments against him.

References 

Living people
1985 births
Ghanaian film actresses
Ghanaian radio presenters
Ghanaian women radio presenters
Ghanaian television presenters
Ghanaian women television presenters
Ghanaian comedians
Ghanaian women comedians